Robert Scobie may refer to:

Robert Scobie (Australian politician, born 1831) (1831–1909), New South Wales politician, member for Hunter
Robert Scobie (Australian politician, born 1848) (1848–1917), New South Wales politician, member for Wentworth and for Murray